The 2007 Toulon Tournament was the 35th edition of the Toulon Tournament, and was held from 31 May to 9 June. It was won by France, after they beat China 3–1 in the final.

Results

Group A

Table

Match summaries

Group B

Table

Match summaries

Semi-finals

Third-place playoff

Final

Squads

External links
RSSF

 
2007
2006–07 in French football
2007 in youth association football